Seaton Iron Works was an iron works which operated between 1763 and 1899 under different titles and various owners. The site chosen was on the north bank of the River Derwent and was in the parish of Seaton, Cumberland.  As well as making iron it also manufactured iron goods, tin plate and under control of Adam Heslop a foundry owner of Lowca, Cumberland was a manufacturer of stationary steam engines.

History
The Seaton Iron Works were set up in 1762 by the firm of Hicks Spedding & Co., on land leased from Sir James Lowther for ninety-nine years.  The expansive premises were planned and built under the direction of Richard Spedding, a noted local engineer and built in 1863.  His father was Carlisle Spedding who sank the Saltom Coal Mine and was sited south of Whitehaven Harbour.  The works were known as the "Barepot Works", a corruption of the name of the ground where the establishment lay, "Beer-pot".  From a two blast furnaces, bar and wrought iron was produced, and in an adjoining foundry were manufactured ships' cannon, steam engines and other ironware.

The iron works was purchased in 1837 by Tulk Ley & Co. in the same package as when they purchased the Lowca Engineering Works at Lowca, Cumberland.  Under the control of Tulk, Ley and Co., the blast furnaces were consequently rebuilt and the works reorganised.  However, iron production only lasted until 1857 and the premises were eventually advertised for sale as a tinplate works in 1869.

The works was bought by William Ivander Griffiths a Welshman from Treforest in Wales who had served a career in tin plate making in Wales.  He brought his own workers with him and formed a music society that performed music festivals in Workington. The demand for tinplate fluctuated and Griffiths eventually sold out to a nearby Steelworks in 1885. Griffiths was kept on as Works manager by the West Cumberland Hematite Iron & Steel Company, but the purchase turned out to be a poor investment.

A siding from the Cockermouth and Workington Section of the London & North Western Railway soon after the purchase to take finished products away by rail. The purchasing company had its own business problems and by 1890 was suffering from financial difficulties. The works remained open for another nine years and after a struggle to pay its commitments the works was closed down in 1899. The buildings and siding remained intact for a couple of years but when no new buyer came forward the works were dismantled over a period of time.  The last buildings were pulled down by 1904, leaving very little trace of a concern which had once employed hundreds of people, except for a reservoir and the source canal.

Model boating enthusiasts used the reservoir to sail boats on between the two world wars and again in the 1950s.

Remaining products
Two Heslop engines built circa 1824, which were built under licence using James Watt's ideas on steam engines, are today in the collection of the Science Museum in London.

Reference list

Engineering companies of the United Kingdom
History of Cumberland
1762 establishments in England
1857 disestablishments in England
British companies established in 1762
Manufacturing companies established in 1762